The Arellano Chiefs basketball program represents Arellano University in men's basketball as a member of the National Collegiate Athletic Association (Philippines) (NCAA). Originally the Arellano Flaming Arrows, the Arellano Chiefs have previously played in the National Capital Region Athletic Association (NCRAA), winning two consecutive championships from 2007 and 2008. The Chiefs transferred to the NCAA in 2010, and have qualified to two Finals appearances, in 2014 and 2016, losing each time to the defending champions San Beda Red Lions.

History

Beginnings 
The Arellano Flaming Arrows won the Basketball Association of the Philippines-organized National Student's Championship in the 1970s. The Flaming Arrows, coached by Cholo Martin and led by Joey Loyzaga, defeated the De La Salle Green Archers in the 1983 National Intercollegiate Championship. In 2006, the Flaming Arrows were named into the Chiefs, in honor of Cayetano Arellano, the first Chief Justice of the Philippines and university's namesake.

From 2007 to 2008, the Chiefs won the NCRAA title; in the 2009 campaign they were defeated by the Universal College Golden Dragons in the finals. Arellano sought to enter the NCAA in time for the 2009–10 season, but the association deferred in accepting new members. The NCAA instead invited three schools, including Arellano as guest teams.

Entry to the NCAA 
The Chiefs ended up with the best record among the three guest teams. In 2014, led by Jio Jalalon and coach Jerry Codiñera, the Chiefs qualified to its first Finals appearance. They were swept by the four-time defending champions San Beda Red Lions. On the next year, the Chiefs missed the Final Four, but returned to the Finals in 2016. In a rematch of the 2014 Finals, the Chiefs were again swept by San Beda. Two years later, the Chiefs struggled on the floor and had a losing season. Codiñera resigned and replaced by Junjie Ablan.

On the next campaign the university rehired Cholo Martin as its new coach.  Martin's best season came in the 2021 bubble season played in early 2022, where they were eliminated in the play-in tournament by the Perpetual Altas.

Current roster
NCAA Season 98

Head coaches 
 2010–2011: Leo Isaac
 2011: Junjie Ablan
 2012–13: Koy Banal
 2013–18: Jerry Codiñera
 2018: Junjie Ablan (interim)
 2018–present: Cholo Martin

Season-by-season records

References 

National Collegiate Athletic Association (Philippines) basketball teams